The 2016 National Hockey League All-Star Game was held on January 31, 2016. The game was held in Nashville, Tennessee, at Bridgestone Arena, home of the Nashville Predators. This was Nashville's first time hosting the NHL All-Star Game.

For this edition, the all-star game was replaced with a four-team, three-on-three, single-elimination tournament, with one team representing each of the league's four divisions. The all-stars from the Pacific Division won the four-team tournament. Team captain John Scott, an enforcer voted into the game through a fan vote, scored two goals and was given the game's most valuable player award.

Format
On November 18, 2015, the NHL announced significant changes to the All-Star Game format, replacing the previous two-team format with a 3-on-3 tournament between All-Star teams representing the league's four divisions; the Atlantic division played the Metropolitan, while the Central played the Pacific. Each game was played in two 10-minute halves, and went directly to a shootout in the event of a tie. The winners of the two semi-final games played in a championship game to determine the winner of the competition.

Rosters
National Hockey League staff and associates voted internally to determine the rosters. Fan voting was altered to match the new divisional format. Voting determined the captains of each division, with the condition the player plays in the division they captain. This change was likely due to recent exploitation of the older method. For example, the fan votes in the 2015 All-Star Game were dominated by Chicago Blackhawks players and Buffalo Sabres forward Zemgus Girgensons, who was voted in following a heavy campaign in his native country of Latvia.

Florida Panthers forward Jaromir Jagr tried to get fans to not vote for him; at age 43, he stated that he preferred to rest during the All-Star break rather than play in the 3-on-3 format. Girgensons also stated that he did not believe that he deserved an All Star spot this year since he only recorded four points up to that point in the season.

Following weeks of fan voting, the four captains were announced on January 2, 2016. Jagr was selected to lead the Atlantic, along with Alexander Ovechkin of the Washington Capitals (Metropolitan), Patrick Kane of the Chicago Blackhawks (Central) and John Scott of the Arizona Coyotes (Pacific).

Scott received the most votes of any player, despite having only recorded one point in 11 games played with the Coyotes (Scott spent much of the season in the AHL, or as a healthy scratch) and scoring five goals in his entire career up to that point. The situation was compared to Rory Fitzpatrick's All Star campaign in 2007, in which fans vote for a player who would not conventionally be chosen as an All-Star. Despite this, both Scott and the NHL honoured the results. Scott was traded out of the Pacific Division and demoted out of the league on January 15, 2016 in a move that sent Scott to the Montreal Canadiens, who in turn assigned him to the American Hockey League's St. John's IceCaps; the trade was expected to make him ineligible to serve as captain in the All-Star Game, but the NHL announced shortly after the trade that he would be permitted to participate as a free agent for the Pacific Division.

The rest of the rosters were revealed on January 6, 2016, with each of the NHL's 30 teams being represented by at least one player at the time the rosters were set (Arizona, whose lone All-Star was Scott, would ultimately not be represented). The coaches for each division's team were determined by the teams with the highest point percentage in each division following the completion of games on January 9, 2016. The coaches with each distinction included: Gerard Gallant (Florida Panthers) for the Atlantic Division, Lindy Ruff (Dallas Stars) for the Central Division, Darryl Sutter (Los Angeles Kings) for the Pacific Division, and Barry Trotz (Washington Capitals) for the Metropolitan Division. On January 21, 2016, the NHL announced the addition of country music stars Vince Gill, Dierks Bentley, Charles Kelley, and Chris Young as celebrity coaches to each team; Amy Grant replaced Kelley before the game.

Injury replacements were announced on January 28, 2016, with Evgeny Kuznetsov replacing teammate Ovechkin, who was out with a lower-body injury, and James Neal replacing Jonathan Toews, who was out due to illness. To replace Ovechkin's captaincy, John Tavares was awarded the "C".

† Ovechkin was replaced by Kuznetsov due to a lower-body injury.

‡ Toews was replaced by Neal due to illness.

Bracket

Game summaries

East game

West game

Final

Uniforms
After the previous game featured black and neon green uniforms with chrome logos, the NHL opted to go with a more traditional design for this game. Once again, the dark uniform was black and the light uniform was white, but the trim colors included dark gray and golden yellow, with the uniform numbers featuring a two-tone beveled design. Both jerseys featured gray upper sleeves and a gray panel on the back containing the nameplate. The three stars of the Flag of Tennessee were featured on the collar of the jersey and the right pants leg.

Because only two jersey designs were used, all four divisional teams were issued jerseys in both colors. In the first game, the Atlantic Division wore black against the Metropolitan Division in white, while in the second game, the Pacific Division wore white against the Central Division in black. For the final game, the Atlantic and Pacific Division teams switched jersey colors, with the Atlantic now wearing white against the black-clad Pacific.

Festivities
Alongside the 3-on-3 tournament the NHL hosted several other events during the All-Star weekend.
 2016 NHL Fan Fair
 NHL Mascot Showdown
 2016 Honda NHL All-Star Skills Competition
 Live musical performances by Corrina and Vince Gill (U.S. national anthem), Lennon & Maisy (Canadian national anthem), Lee Brice (pre-game performance), Jennifer Nettles (second intermission), Sixwire (house band) and Small Time Rock Stars (house band)
 Colors Presentation during the singing of the Anthems was by the Music City Composite Squadron Honor Guard, Civil Air Patrol (SER-TN-185).  Led by C/Lt Col Zachary Divers (U.S. Flag) and also composed of C/CMSgt Liam Howard (C.A.P. Flag), C/CMSgt Patrick May (Right Guard), C/SSgt Teagan Murphy (Left Guard), as well as Capt Eric Howard (Canadian Flag), and Maj Kevin Divers (Tennessee Flag) with Capt Michael May supervising.  This was the first time in Civil Air Patrol's 75 year History to have a unit support a Major Professional Sport's All Star Game as a Color Guard or Honor Guard.

NHL All-Star Skills Competition
The competition was held on January 30, 2016 and was broken up into six events: Bridgestone NHL Fastest Skater, Honda NHL Breakaway Challenge, DraftKings NHL Accuracy Shooting, Gatorade NHL Skills Challenge Relay, AMP Energy NHL Hardest Shot, and the Discover NHL Shootout. Teams Atlantic and Metropolitan combined to represent the Eastern Conference, and teams Central and Pacific combined to represent the Western Conference.

Fastest Skater
In this event, four pairs of skaters raced each other simultaneously on parallel short-courses on the rink. The fastest skater in the head-to-head match-ups received the chance to skate a full lap of the outside border of the rink, in the direction of their choosing, in an attempt to break Mike Gartner's record (13.386).The winner of each match-up scored one point, the team with the fastest skater scored a bonus point, and an extra bonus point was awarded for breaking Mike Gartner's record.

Breakaway Challenge
In this competition, competitors skated with the puck and attempted to score on the opposing team's goalie. Each competitor had two chances. The winner was judged on their presentation, style, creativity, and flair. NHL penalty shot rules did not apply. The winner was determined by fan-vote through Twitter and was rewarded one point for their team. The winner, P.K. Subban, donned a wig, black hockey-pants, an old hockey helmet, and a Jaromir Jagr jersey, skated in, and slid the puck into the net, after initially hitting the post, completing his best Jagr impression with a salute to the crowd. Runner-up Brent Burns was joined by his son Jagger, and Sharks teammate Joe Pavelski and his son Nathan. Former teammates Cory Schneider and Roberto Luongo staged a mock argument in the net to leave it empty while Jagger got the puck from Nathan and scored.

While all other lineups were submitted by the team captains, this event also allowed fan-vote via Twitter to secure a guaranteed spot in the event for an eligible player of their choice. Voting was open from January 26, 2016 to January 28, 2016

Accuracy Shooting
In this event, competitors were positioned in front of the net, and were passed the puck from two players situated behind the goal line. The players had to hit targets at the four corners of the net in the fastest time. The event consisted of four head-to-head match-ups, with one shooter from each team per round. The winner of each match-up scored one point and the player who hit all four targets in the fastest time scored a bonus point.

Challenge Relay
In this competition, teams of 14 players and 2 goalies were selected from each side to compete in a timed relay event which consisted of four relays with five challenges each: One Timers, Passing, Puck Control, Stick-Handling, and Goalie Goals. Each player on the team had one skill to complete before the next player could start. The goal was to complete the relay in the fastest time. The team with the fastest time in each heat scored one point, and the team with the fastest overall time scored one bonus point.

Hardest Shot
In this competition, players skated in from the blue line, and slapped a puck placed 30 feet from the net as fast as possible into the net. The event consisted of four head-to-head match-ups where each player attempted two shots, with the fastest of their two shots recorded. The winner of each match-up scored one point, and the team with the player who had the fastest speed scored one bonus point.

Shootout
18 skaters and three goaltenders from each team will participate in the three-round shootout, with each round using six skaters and one goalie from each team. Teams received two minutes per round, to score as many goals as possible. NHL shootout rules applied to each scoring attempt. One point was awarded for each goal scored, except for players one and three from each team who were designated "Discover puck players", and goals scored by these players counted as two.

italics = Heat winner
bold = Event winner
* denotes record

See also
NHL All-Star Game
2015–16 NHL season

Notes

References

2016
All-Star Game
2016 in sports in Tennessee
Sports competitions in Nashville, Tennessee
2016 National Hockey League All-Star Game
January 2016 sports events in the United States
Ice hockey competitions in Tennessee